Vegard Høidalen (born 10 May 1971 in Skien) is a professional beach volleyball player from Norway, who twice represented his native country at the Summer Olympics: 2000 and 2004. Partnering Jørre Kjemperud he won the bronze medal in the men's beach team competition at the 2001 Beach Volleyball World Championships in Klagenfurt, Austria.

Høidalen was for a period in 2008 suspended from beach volleyball, because of three violations within an 18 months period, of Antidoping Norge's requirements regarding athlete availability for out-of-competition testing, which includes failure to provide whereabouts information. Høidalen was critical to how the system works.

References

External links
 
 
 
 

1971 births
Living people
Norwegian beach volleyball players
Men's beach volleyball players
Beach volleyball players at the 2000 Summer Olympics
Beach volleyball players at the 2004 Summer Olympics
Olympic beach volleyball players of Norway
Sportspeople from Skien